Kumalae was a Hawaiian High Chief, Aliʻi Nui (ruler) of Hilo. He is also known as Kumalae-nui-a-ʻUmi ("Kumalae the Great, son of ʻUmi").

Family 
He was born about 1648.

His father was ʻUmi-a-Liloa, Aliʻi Aimoku of Hawaiʻi. His mother was  Piʻikea, daughter of Piʻilani of Maui. Kumalae’s uncles were Lono-a-Piilani and Kiha-a-Piilani and his brothers were Kealiiokaloa and Keawenuiaumi. Kumalae was given the district of Hilo to rule as its district chief, and his successors would be notable as being fiercely resistant to the main line of the Hawaiian chiefs descended from his elder brothers.

Kumalae married Kuanu'upu'awalau (Kua-nuʻu-pü’awa-lau, Ku-nu'u-nui-pu'awa-lau, Ke-kai-ha'a-kuloulanio-Kahiki). She bore him Makuanui, his successor as Aliʻi of Hilo.

References

External links 
The Hawaiian Electronic Library

Royalty of Hawaii (island)